Marcus Collins (born 1988) is an English singer and finalist on The X Factor in 2011.

Marcus Collins may also refer to:

 Marcus Collins (album), the singer's self-titled debut album
 Marcus Evelyn Collins (1861–1944), British architect
 Marcus Collins, American actor and singer with country trio The Texas Tenors